In the mathematical theory of dynamical systems, an exponential dichotomy is a property of an equilibrium point that extends the idea of hyperbolicity to non-autonomous systems.

Definition
If

is a linear non-autonomous dynamical system in Rn with fundamental solution matrix Φ(t), Φ(0) = I, then the equilibrium point 0 is said to have an exponential dichotomy if there exists a (constant) matrix P such that P2 = P and positive constants K, L, α, and β such that

and

If furthermore, L = 1/K and β = α, then 0 is said to have a uniform exponential dichotomy.

The constants α and β allow us to define the spectral window of the equilibrium point, (−α, β).

Explanation
The matrix P is a projection onto the stable subspace and I − P is a projection onto the unstable subspace.  What the exponential dichotomy says is that the norm of the projection onto the stable subspace of any orbit in the system decays exponentially as t → ∞ and the norm of the projection onto the unstable subspace of any orbit decays exponentially as t → −∞, and furthermore that the stable and unstable subspaces are conjugate (because ).

An equilibrium point with an exponential dichotomy has many of the properties of a hyperbolic equilibrium point in autonomous systems.  In fact, it can be shown that a hyperbolic point has an exponential dichotomy.

References

 Coppel, W. A. Dichotomies in stability theory, Springer-Verlag (1978),  

Dynamical systems
Dichotomies